It is Mexico's major and most important Rugby Union league.

History
In the year 2000 the FMRU decided to create a professional rugby league, and as a result we have Mexican Major Rugby League.

Teams
 Aztecas Rugby Club
 Black Thunder Rugby Football Club
 Rugby Borregos Chihuahua
 Universidad de Celaya Rugby Club
 Cumiyais Monterrey Rugby Club
 Dragones Rugby Club
 Eek´Baalam Rugby Club
 Universidad de Guanajuato Rugby Club
 Hammerheads Cancun Rugby Club
 IPN Hell Sharks Rugby Team
 Jaguares Football Rugby Club
 Legion de Cuervos Rugby Club
 Leones Rugby Club Colima
 Lobos Rugby Club
 Maori Rugby Football Club
 Miquiztli Rugby Club
 Queretaro Rugby Club
 Rhinos Rugby Club Guadalajara
 Tazmania Rugby Club
 Templarios Rugby Football Club
 Tomas Moro Rugby Club
 Pumas Rugby UNAM
 Wallabies Rugby Football Club
University of Monterrey (UDEM) Troyanos (as) Rugby Club

See also 
 Black Thunder Rugby Football Club
 Hammerheads Cancun Rugby Club

References 
 https://web.archive.org/web/20110714084000/http://www.mexrugby.com/index.php

Rugby union in Mexico
Rugby